Noah Yap Rong Yew (born 4 November 1993) is a Singaporean actor and singer.

Career
Yap has become a local celebrity after the successes of Ah Boys to Men movie series by director Jack Neo.

Personal life
Yap's entertainment career got kickstarted in 2012 when he appeared in Ah Boys to Men and started his YouTube channel. His parents supported his decision to drop out of school to pursue a career in entertainment.

Legal issues
In 2016, Yap was jailed for nine months in Singapore Armed Forces (SAF) detention barracks on Wednesday, 2 March 2016 for the consumption of cannabis. Responding to media queries, the Defence Ministry confirmed that Yap was found guilty under Section 8(b)(ii) of the Misuse of Drugs Act. This happened while Yap was serving his mandatory two-year National Service. Yap was sentenced at the SAF Court Martial Centre. If found guilty, first-time offenders can be jailed between nine and 15 months. Repeat offenders can be jailed and caned.

In November 2017, Yap released a video to share his story to encourage others not to misuse drugs and for society to give a second chance to ex-offenders.

Filmography

Film

Television

Theatre

References

External links
 

1993 births
Living people
Singaporean people of Chinese descent
21st-century Singaporean male actors
21st-century Singaporean male singers